Keith Robert Dorney (born December 3, 1957) is a former American college and professional football player who was an offensive tackle in the National Football League (NFL) for nine seasons in the 1970s and 1980s.  He played college football for Pennsylvania State University, and received All-American honors.  Dorney was chosen in the first round of the 1979 NFL Draft, and played for the NFL's Detroit Lions during his entire professional career.

Early years
Dorney was born in Allentown, Pennsylvania. He grew up in Macungie, Pennsylvania in the Lehigh Valley region of eastern Pennsylvania. He played high school football at Emmaus High School in Emmaus, Pennsylvania, which competed in the East Penn Conference and is known for its success in producing collegiate and NFL football talent. In his autobiography, Dorney dramatically recounts playing for Emmaus, including one play in which he simultaneously tackled the opposing quarterback and running back during a handoff in a goal line stand. It resulted in a serious concussion that produced some minor anterograde amnesia.

College career
Dorney attended Pennsylvania State University, where he played for coach Joe Paterno's Penn State Nittany Lions football team from 1975 to 1978.  As a senior in 1978, he was recognized as a consensus first-team All-American and an Academic All-American.  He earned a Bachelor of Science in insurance and real estate from Penn State in 1979, and a master's degree in education from the University of San Francisco.  In tribute of his play at Penn State, Dorney was inducted into the College Football Hall of Fame in 2005.

Professional career
Following his Penn State football career, Dorney entered the 1979 NFL Draft and was selected by the Detroit Lions in the draft's first-round, with the 10th overall selection.  He played in the NFL for nine years, from 1979 to 1987.  He was selected to the Pro Bowl once (1982).  For the Lions, he played both offensive guard and offensive tackle. He was also the team's offensive captain from 1983 to 1987.

Dorney's NFL career was highlighted by his role as a lead blocker for NFL rushing great Billy Sims, who is 32nd in all-time NFL rushing yards.

Personal life
Dorney's autobiography, Black and Honolulu Blue: In the Trenches of the NFL, chronicles his life and football career.

From 2003 to 2006, Dorney was on the faculty of Cardinal Newman High School in Santa Rosa, California, teaching freshman English.  Dorney and Hall of Fame quarterback Joe Montana both provided Cardinal Newman with periodic coaching support.

References
 

1957 births
Living people
All-American college football players
American football offensive linemen
College Football Hall of Fame inductees
Detroit Lions players
Emmaus High School alumni
National Conference Pro Bowl players
Penn State Nittany Lions football players
Sportspeople from Allentown, Pennsylvania
Players of American football from Pennsylvania
University of San Francisco alumni
Ed Block Courage Award recipients